Shevon Jemie Lai (born 8 August 1993) is a Malaysian badminton player.

Career 
She started playing badminton at her primary school SJKC Kuen Cheng 2, then in 2011 she joined the Malaysia national badminton team. She competed at the BWF World Junior Championships in the mixed team event and won a silver medal in 2009, a bronze medal in 2010, and a gold medal in 2011. In 2012, she became the champion of the Smiling Fish International tournament in the mixed doubles event partnered with Wong Fai Yin. She also became the semi-finalist of the Malaysia International tournament in women's doubles event partnered with Marylen Ng and at the Singapore International tournament in mixed's doubles event partnered with Ong Jian Guo. In 2013, she represented Kolej Komuniti Kuala Langat competed at the Summer Universiade in Kazan, Russia.

In 2014, she also became the semi-finalist of the Singapore International Series and Malaysia International Challenge tournaments in mixed doubles event partnered with Tan Chee Tean. In September 2014, she became the runner-up of the Vietnam International Series tournament defeated by the Đào Mạnh Thắng and Phạm Như Thảo of Vietnam with the score 21–14, 21–11. In December 2014, she became the champion of the Bangladesh International tournament in mixed doubles event after defeat her compatriot Tan Wee Gieen and Peck Yen Wei with the score 21–17, 21–18.

In 2015, she became the runner-up of the Granular-Thailand International Challenge tournament in mixed doubles event after defeated by Choi Sol-gyu and former World Junior Champion Chae Yoo-jung of South Korea with the score 18–21, 21–19, 21–12. In November, she became the runner-up in mixed doubles event partnered with Tan Wee Gieen and semi-finalist in women's doubles event partnered with Peck Yen Wei at the Bangladesh International tournament.

In 2016, she won the Romanian International tournament in mixed doubles event partnered with Wong Fai Yin, after edging their teammates Ong Yew Sin and Peck Yen Wei with the score 21–15, 21–17. She also became the runner-up of Smiling Fish International tournament in mixed doubles.

In November 2016, she was paired with Goh Soon Huat a former men's singles badminton player, and they will compete at the Malaysia International Challenge tournament.

Achievements

Southeast Asian Games 
Mixed doubles

BWF World Tour (2 titles, 2 runners-up) 
The BWF World Tour, which was announced on 19 March 2017 and implemented in 2018, is a series of elite badminton tournaments sanctioned by the Badminton World Federation (BWF). The BWF World Tour is divided into levels of World Tour Finals, Super 1000, Super 750, Super 500, Super 300, and the BWF Tour Super 100.

Mixed doubles

BWF Grand Prix (1 title, 2 runners-up) 
The BWF Grand Prix had two levels, the Grand Prix and Grand Prix Gold. It was a series of badminton tournaments sanctioned by the Badminton World Federation (BWF) and played between 2007 and 2017.

Mixed doubles

  BWF Grand Prix Gold tournament
  BWF Grand Prix tournament

BWF International Challenge / Series (4 titles, 5 runners-up) 
Mixed doubles

  BWF International Challenge tournament
  BWF International Series tournament

References

External links 
 
 

1993 births
Living people
People from Selangor
Malaysian sportspeople of Chinese descent
Malaysian female badminton players
Badminton players at the 2018 Commonwealth Games
Commonwealth Games silver medallists for Malaysia
Commonwealth Games medallists in badminton
Badminton players at the 2018 Asian Games
Asian Games competitors for Malaysia
Competitors at the 2017 Southeast Asian Games
Competitors at the 2019 Southeast Asian Games
Southeast Asian Games silver medalists for Malaysia
Southeast Asian Games bronze medalists for Malaysia
Southeast Asian Games medalists in badminton
Medallists at the 2018 Commonwealth Games